Poetic justice is a literary device.

Poetic justice may also refer to:

Film and television
Poetic Justice (film), a 1993 film by John Singleton
Poetic Justice, a 1972 film from Hollis Frampton's Hapax Legomena cycle
Poetic Justice (TV series), a 2012 Singaporean Chinese-language drama series
"Poetic Justice" (The Jeffersons), a 1982 TV episode
"Poetic Justice" (Porridge), a 1977 TV episode

Literature
Poetic Justice, a 1996 historical novel by Nigel Tranter

Music
Poetic Justice (Lillian Axe album) or the title song, 1992
Poetic Justice (Stan Rogers album), two radio plays with music by Rogers, 1996
Poetic Justice (Steve Harley album), 1996
Poetic Justice (soundtrack), from the film, 1993
"Poetic Justice" (song), by Kendrick Lamar, 2012